1808: The Flight of the Emperor, subtitled How a Weak Prince, a Mad Queen, and the British Navy Tricked Napoleon and Changed the New World (which translates as How a mad queen, a coward prince and a corrupt court fooled Napoleon and changed the History of Portugal and Brazil) is a non-fiction historical book written by Laurentino Gomes, edited by Planeta.

In 2008, the book was awarded as the best essay book by Academia Brasileira de Letras. It was also awarded twice a Prêmio Jabuti, at the categories "best reportage-book" and "non-fiction book of the year".

The same author published 1822, a sequel.

Main characters
Dona Maria de Portugal (the mad queen)
Dom João VI (the coward prince)
Napoleon Bonaparte

See also
 1822

References

2007 non-fiction books
21st-century history books
Books about Brazil
History books about the 19th century
Napoleonic Wars books
John VI of Portugal